"Popcorn" (first version "Pop Corn") is an instrumental composed by Gershon Kingsley in 1969 for the album Music to Moog By on Audio Fidelity Records label. The Moog synthesizer instrumental became a worldwide hit, first in 1972 when a version by Hot Butter was released. Since then, multiple versions of the piece have been produced and released, including those by Vyacheslav Mescherin, Anarchic System, Popcorn Makers, the Boomtang Boys, M & H Band, Crazy Frog and The Muppets.

Hot Butter version 

In 1972, a rearranged version of the instrumental was recorded by Kingsley's First Moog Quartet. This was intended for the namesake album (First Moog Quartet) which had otherwise been a re-release of the 1970 First Moog Quartet album with the same name. The 1972 version of the instrumental had the now current title "Popcorn". In that same year, Stan Free, a fellow member of the First Moog Quartet, re-recorded another instrumental, based on the 1972 version, with his own band Hot Butter. This was released as a single and became a hit in mainland Europe, spending several weeks at No. 1 in numerous countries on the continent, including France (4 weeks at the top) and Switzerland (10 weeks), ultimately becoming the biggest-selling single of 1972 in both countries. "Popcorn" was also a No. 1 hit in Germany (3 weeks), the Netherlands (7 weeks) and Norway (9 weeks).

Track listings 

7" single

 "Popcorn" – 2:30
 "At the Movies" – 2:31

Charts

Weekly charts

Year-end charts

Crazy Frog version 

In 2005, Crazy Frog released a cover of "Popcorn", the  remix of which was arranged by Jamba!, and also marketed as a ringtone. The song differs from Crazy Frog's debut release "Axel F" in that it does not contain the trademark "Crazy Frog sound" by Daniel Malmedahl.

The single was a hit in various countries, particularly in France, where it enjoyed its greatest success. Replacing Crazy Frog's own song "Axel F" at No. 1 on 24 September 2005, the track remained at the top spot for seven weeks, with its best weekly sales of 71,777 copies in its second week. Certified Diamond status just three months after its release by the SNEP, as of August 2014, this version of "Popcorn" is the 40th best-selling single of the 21st century in France, with 458,000 copies sold. The track also topped the charts in Belgium, New Zealand and Spain.

The music video, CGI-animated, was produced by Kaktus Film and Erik Wernquist of TurboForce3D and features Crazy Frog causing chaos at the undersea labs of the drones. A significantly shortened version of this video was also used for the Frog's version of "U Can't Touch This".

UK

 "Popcorn" (radio mix)
 "Popcorn" (radio mix instrumental)
 "Popcorn" (potatoheadz mix)
 "Popcorn" (radikal mix)
 "Popcorn" (resource mix)
 "Popcorn" (video)

Australia

 "Popcorn" (radio mix)
 "Popcorn" (potatoheadz mix)
 "Popcorn" (resource mix)
 "Who Let the Frog Out?"

Charts

Weekly charts

Year-end charts

Certifications

Legacy and influence 
Soviet animated series "Nu, pogodi!" featured this song in the 10th episode of the series. The Japanese release of the video game Pengo used an 8-bit interpretation of "Popcorn". French electronic composer and musician Jean-Michel Jarre recorded a 1972 version under the pseudonyms Pop Corn Orchestra and Jammie Jeferson. Later he was inspired by this song to compose his 1976 biggest hit Oxygène (Part IV). A version of "Popcorn", performed by Herb Alpert & the Tijuana Brass appeared on season 3 episode 9 of Better Call Saul. In early 2019, when Kingsley died, the experimental composer Blanck Mass chose "Popcorn" as one of the 10 most influential compositions of his career. In 2022, Swedish singer Tove Lo sampled the Hot Butter version in her single "2 Die 4".

Other versions 
The 1972 cover by the Popcorn Makers reached No. 7 on the German charts and No. 1 on the Dutch Charts. The version by French band Anarchic System was released in 1972 and reached at No. 13 on the German charts, No. 10 on the Dutch charts and No. 1 on the Ultratop 50. 

In 1987, the French M & H Band (sole member Mark Haliday), released a version of "Popcorn" which peaked at No. 8 on the Norwegian charts and at No. 20 on the Swedish charts. This single's release was accompanied by the first purpose-produced music video. Canadian group the Boomtang Boys covered "Popcorn" in 1999, their version peaked at No. 26 on the Billboard Dance Club Songs chart, where it stayed for 9 weeks. It also reached No. 10 on RPM's Canadian dance chart. Richárd Moldován known as Richi M released in 2000 year a cover version which reached at No. 9 on the Swedish charts.

See also 
 List of number-one singles in Australia during the 1970s
 List of number-one singles of 1972 (France)
 List of number-one hits of 1972 (Germany)
 List of Dutch Top 40 number-one singles of 1972
 List of number-one singles from 1968 to 1979 (Switzerland)
 List of Ultratop 40 number-one singles of 2005
 List of number-one singles of 2005 (France)
 List of number-one singles in 2005 (New Zealand)
 List of number-one singles of 2005 (Spain)

References 

1960s instrumentals
1969 songs
1972 debut singles
2005 singles
American synth-pop songs
Pop instrumentals
Gershon Kingsley songs
Anarchic System songs
Crazy Frog songs
Ministry of Sound singles
Music published by Bourne Co. Music Publishers
Musicor Records singles
Novelty songs
Dutch Top 40 number-one singles
Number-one singles in Australia
Number-one singles in France
Number-one singles in Germany
Number-one singles in Norway
Number-one singles in Spain
Number-one singles in Switzerland
Number-one singles in New Zealand
SNEP Top Singles number-one singles
Ultratop 50 Singles (Wallonia) number-one singles
Ultratop 50 Singles (Flanders) number-one singles